Bittern is a classification of wading birds in the heron family.

Bittern may also refer to:

Places
 Bittern, Victoria, a town in Australia
 Bittern railway station, on the Stony Point line
 Bittern Lake, a village in Alberta, Canada
 Bittern Line a railway in Norfolk, England

Vehicles
 LNER Class A4 4464 Bittern, a preserved British steam locomotive
 Boulton Paul Bittern, a British fighter aircraft design of the 1920s
 HMS Bittern, the name of seven ships of the Royal Navy
 USS Bittern, several ships in the United States Navy

Other
 Bittern (salt), a waste product of solar salt operations rich in magnesium sulfate
 Operation Bittern, a British military operation in World War II

See also
 Bitterne, a suburb of Southampton, England
 Bitter (disambiguation)